Pterotrichina elegans is a species of spiders in the family Gnaphosidae. It was first described in 1921 by Dalmas. It is found in Algeria, Tunisia.

References

External links 
 Pterotrichina elegans at the World Spider Catalog

Gnaphosidae
Spiders described in 1921
Spiders of Africa